The Lindenwood Lady Lions women represented Lindenwood University in CHA women's ice hockey during the 2014-15 NCAA Division I women's ice hockey season. The Lady Lions finished conference play in fifth place, and were eliminated in the first round of the CHA Tournament Final by Penn State.

Offseason
July 8: Eighteen players were named to the CHA All-Academic Team.
August 18: Nicole Hensley was named to the 2014 Team USA U-22 Team.

Roster

2014–15 Lady Lions

Schedule

|-
!colspan=12 style=" "| Regular Season

|-
!colspan=12 style=" "|CHA Tournament

Awards and honors

Nicole Hensley, 2014-15 All-CHA First Team 
Sharra Jasper, 2014-15 All-CHA First Team

References

Lindenwood
Lindenwood Lions women's ice hockey seasons
Lindenwood
Lindenwood